Below are the Turkey women's national football team all time results:

Best / worst results

Best

Worst

Main results

1995–99

1995

1996

1997

1998

1999

2000–09

2000

2001

2002

2003–05
Women football leagues, governed by the Turkish Football Federation, were not held in the seasons 2003–04, 2004–05 and 2005–06. Consequently, no women's national team were formed, and Turkey's participation at international competitions did not take place.

2006

2007

2008

2009

2010–19

2010

2011

2012

2013

2014

2015

2016

2017

2018

2019

2020–29

2020

2021

2022

Official Turkey Results – TFF.org
Turkey Results and Fixtures – Soccerway.com
Worldfootball.net

Head-to-head record
The following table shows Turkey's all-time international record, as of 28 January 2023.

See also
 Turkey women's national football team head to head
 Turkey national football team results

References

External links
 Official Web Site: Turkish Football Federation

Results
Women's
Women's national association football team results